Lobby for Cyprus is a non-party-political human rights NGO that is based in London in the United Kingdom. Lobby for Cyprus campaigns for the reunification of Cyprus and for the human rights of Cypriots.

See also
Loizidou v. Turkey
Greek Cypriots, et al. v. TRNC and HSBC Bank USA
Eleni Foka
Titina Loizidou
Human rights in Northern Cyprus

References

External links
Lobby for Cyprus
Ayios Amvrosios Association

Human rights in Cyprus